Don Gregory Graham (born May 19, 1955) is an American college basketball coach. He is a former head men's basketball coach at Boise State University.

Early life and college playing career
Graham was born in Louisville, Ohio and graduated from Louisville High School in 1973. After high school, Graham attended the University of Oregon (UO) in Eugene and played at guard on the Oregon Ducks men's basketball team from 1973 to 1977 under Dick Harter. As a senior, Graham was team captain and was the team's leading scorer with 21.7 points per game, as well as the leading rebounder (9.8). Graham graduated from the University of Oregon College of Arts and Sciences in 1978 with a degree in biology.

Coaching career

High school (1978–1982)
Graham stayed in Eugene after graduating from UO to be assistant coach at Marist Catholic High School for one season. In 1979, Graham became varsity boys' basketball head coach at alma mater Louisville High School and enrolled in graduate school at the University of Dayton. Graham left Louisville in 1982, the year he completed a master's degree in educational administration at Dayton.

Early college coaching career (1982–1984)
Graham returned to the University of Oregon to be assistant coach under Jim Haney for the 1982–83 season. The following season, Graham became an assistant at New Mexico under Gary Colson, in a season where New Mexico made the NIT.

Western New Mexico (1984–1985)
Graham had his first head coaching job at Western New Mexico in the 1984–85 season. He led Western New Mexico to an 18–5 record during a season on probation by the Rocky Mountain Athletic Conference and NAIA.

Later college assistant coaching career (1985–2002)
From 1985 to 1989, Graham was assistant coach at San Jose State under Bill Berry. Graham then moved to San Diego State to coach under Jim Brandenburg, from 1989 to 1992.

Graham then was an assistant coach at Saint Mary's from 1992 to 1997 in the first of several assistant coaching stints under Ernie Kent. Graham helped Saint Mary's win the West Coast Conference regular season and qualify for the NCAA tournament by virtue of winning the WCC tournament.

In 1997, Graham had his second stint as assistant coach at Oregon and second assistant coaching job under Ernie Kent. In five seasons with Graham as assistant coach, Oregon made the 1999 NIT semifinals and 2000 NCAA tournament, as well as the Pac-10 regular season championship and Elite Eight round of the NCAA tournament in 2002.

Boise State (2002–2010)
Athletic director Gene Bleymaier hired Graham to be head coach at Boise State in 2002. In eight seasons, Graham had a 142–112 record at Boise State and led Boise State to a berth in the 2004 NIT, 2008 NCAA tournament and 2009 CBI. For leading Boise State to the NCAA Tournament, the Western Athletic Conference named Graham "Coach of the Year" in 2008.

In 2010, after a 15–17 season, Bleymaier fired Graham and stated: "We appreciate everything that Coach Graham and his staff have contributed to Boise State the past eight years. We felt that in the best interest of the program we needed to make a change."

Assistant coaching after Boise State (2011–2017)
In 2011, Graham became an assistant coach again, this time at Bradley under Geno Ford.

After three seasons at Bradley, Graham became an assistant coach at Washington State in 2014, for his third coaching stint under Ernie Kent. He was let go following the 2017 season.

Head coaching record

*Due to probation from the conference, Western New Mexico had an official 0–0 conference record.

References

External links
Washington State bio
Bradley bio
Boise State bio
Oregon bio

1955 births
Living people
American men's basketball coaches
American men's basketball players
Basketball coaches from Ohio
Basketball players from Ohio
Boise State Broncos men's basketball coaches
Bradley Braves men's basketball coaches
College men's basketball head coaches in the United States
High school basketball coaches in the United States
New Mexico Lobos men's basketball coaches
Oregon Ducks men's basketball coaches
Oregon Ducks men's basketball players
People from Louisville, Ohio
Saint Mary's Gaels men's basketball coaches
San Diego State Aztecs men's basketball coaches
San Jose State Spartans men's basketball coaches
Sportspeople from Eugene, Oregon
University of Dayton alumni
Guards (basketball)